Henri J. Haskell (1843–1921) was the first Montana Attorney General from 1889 to 1897.

Haskell was born in Palmyra, Maine, in 1843 to Aretas Haskell and Sophia Hathorn (Haskell). He attended Bates College's Nichols Latin School/Maine Central Institute.  Haskell was a great-nephew of Seth Hathorn who donated Bates' first building. After serving in the American Civil War with the first Maine Cavalry (including at Gettysburg) and being wounded, Haskell returned to his father's farm in Maine, and then moved to Marysville, California where he read law and was admitted to the bar in 1875. Eventually he moved back to Pittsfield, Maine for a period and then to Glendive, Montana where served as a district attorney. He was elected as a member of Montana Territorial House of Representatives in 1888 and served as a delegate to Montana state constitutional convention in 1889. In 1889 Haskell was elected as the first Montana state attorney general and served until 1897 as a Republican. Haskell was an active Freemason. In the election he defeated Ella Knowles Haskell, whom he later married and then divorced in 1897. Henri Haskell died in 1921.

References

1843 births
1921 deaths
Bates College alumni
Montana lawyers
Montana Republicans
People from Palmyra, Maine
Montana Attorneys General
Maine Central Institute alumni
19th-century American lawyers